The  (lit. East Fuji Five Lakes Road) is a 2-laned toll road linking Yamanashi Prefecture and Shizuoka Prefecture in Japan. It is owned and managed by Central Nippon Expressway Company.

Overview
Officially the road is designated as a bypass for National Route 138.

The road functions as an extension of the Chūō Expressway Kawaguchiko Route (a branch route of the Chūō Expressway) in southern Yamanashi Prefecture, passing along the eastern base of Mount Fuji and to the west of the Fuji Five Lakes. The road then crosses into Shizuoka Prefecture to the south. The road terminates at an interchange with the original National Route 138; beyond this point, National Route 138 continues towards the city of Gotenba and an interchange with the Tōmei Expressway.

Tolls are collected at toll plazas located at both ends of the road. Each toll plaza collects 520 yen from regular passenger vehicles. Traversing the entire road therefore costs 1040 yen, while entering or exiting the road at the halfway point (Yamanakako Interchange) costs only 520 yen. Electronic Toll Collection (ETC) is accepted for payment, however no discount programs are in effect.

The northern half of the road was completed in 1986 and the southern half was completed in 1989.

Interchange list

 IC - interchange

References

External links 
Central Nippon Expressway Company

Toll roads in Japan
Roads in Shizuoka Prefecture
Roads in Yamanashi Prefecture